The following is a list of the Flags of Bulgaria.

National flag

Government flags

Office flags

Standards of Royal Family

Military flags

Bulgarian Land Forces

Bulgarian Navy

Republic of Bulgaria

People's Republic of Bulgaria

Kingdom of Bulgaria

Vexillology Association flags

Political flags

Religious flags

Ethnic groups flags

Historical Flags

Other

Flag Proposal

References

See also

 Flag of Bulgaria
 Coat of arms of Bulgaria

Lists and galleries of flags
National symbols of Bulgaria
Flags